Jite Agbro (born Lagos, Nigeria) is a Nigerian-American multimedia visual artist and designer based in Seattle, Washington.

Early life and education 
Agbro was born in Lagos, Nigeria, and raised in Seattle, Washington's Central District.

Career
Agbro has exhibited work throughout the region, including at the Bainbridge Island Museum of art and 4Culture Gallery. Using textile and print based multimedia work, Agbro focuses on non-verbal communication and the idea that everyone presents themselves within a system.

References

External links 

 Official Website

Living people
20th-century American women artists
21st-century American women artists
American multimedia artists
Year of birth missing (living people)
20th-century African-American women
20th-century African-American people
20th-century African-American artists
21st-century African-American women
21st-century African-American artists